Vasia Tzanakari (born 1980) is a Greek writer. She was born in Serres and studied English at the Aristotelian University of Thessaloniki. She pursued postgraduate studies in Athens. She has published two books: Eleven little murders: Stories inspired by Nick Cave songs (2008) and a novel called Johnny & Lulu (2011). She has also edited a music magazine, worked as a journalist, and translated literary works from English to Greek, for example, works by Ian Rankin and Gillian Flynn.

Tzanakari lives in Athens. Her father, Vasilis Tzanakaris (born in Pentapoli, Serres) is writer too.

References

Greek women novelists
1980 births
Living people
People from Serres
Aristotle University of Thessaloniki alumni
Translators to Greek
Greek translators